Gaboxadol, also known as 4,5,6,7-tetrahydroisoxazolo(5,4-c)pyridin-3-ol (THIP), is a conformationally constrained derivative of the alkaloid muscimol that was first synthesized in 1977 by the Danish chemist Povl Krogsgaard-Larsen. In the early 1980s gaboxadol was the subject of a series of pilot studies that tested its efficacy as an analgesic and anxiolytic, as well as a treatment for tardive dyskinesia, Huntington's disease, Alzheimer's disease, and spasticity. It was not until 1996 that researchers attempted to harness gaboxadol's frequently reported sedative "adverse effect" for the treatment of insomnia, resulting in a series of clinical trials sponsored by Lundbeck and Merck. In March, 2007, Merck and Lundbeck cancelled work on the drug, citing safety concerns and the failure of an efficacy trial. It acts on the GABA system, but in a different way from benzodiazepines, Z-Drugs, and barbiturates. Lundbeck states that gaboxadol also increases deep sleep (stage 4). Unlike benzodiazepines, THIP does not demonstrate reinforcement in mice or baboons despite activation of  dopaminergic neurons in the ventral tegmental area.

In 2015, Lundbeck sold its rights to the molecule to Ovid Therapeutics, whose plan is to develop it for FXS and Angelman syndrome. It is known internally in Ovid as OV101.

See also 
 Amanita muscaria
 CI-966
 Ganaxolone
 Ibotenic acid

References

External links 
 
 H. Lundbeck Website
 Medical News Today article
 Report of cancellation of development.
 Gaboxadol

GABAA receptor agonists
GABAA-rho receptor antagonists
Glycine receptor antagonists
Sedatives
Isoxazolidinones
Anticonvulsants
Danish inventions